Charley's Aunt is a 1941 American historical comedy film directed by Archie Mayo. It stars Jack Benny and Kay Francis. It was the third filmed version of the 1892 stage farce of the same name by Brandon Thomas. It remained one of Benny's personal favourites among his own films.

Plot
In 1890, two students at Oxford force their rascally friend and fellow student to pose as an aunt from Brazil—where the nuts come from.

Cast
Jack Benny as Babbs Babberly
Kay Francis as Donna Lucia d'Alvadorez 
James Ellison as Jack Chesney
Anne Baxter as Amy Spettigue
Edmund Gwenn as Stephen Spettigue
Laird Cregar as Sir Francis Chesney
Reginald Owen as Redcliff
Arleen Whelan as Kitty Verdun
Richard Haydn as Charley Wyckham
Ernest Cossart as Brasset
Morton Lowry as Harley Stafford
Will Stanton as Messenger
Lionel Pape as Hilary Babberly
C. Montague Shaw as Elderly Professor
Maurice Cass as Octogenarian Professor
Claud Allister as Cricket Match Spectator
William Austin as Cricket Match Spectator
Brandon Hurst as Coach (uncredited)

Reception

Box office
The film was the 8th most popular movie at the US box office in 1941.

It earned a profit of $772,800.

Critical
In a review contemporary with the film's original release, a critic in The New York Times wrote "when the Benny physiognomy peered impishly from behind a lacy fan, the audience held its sides, and when in the final scene his wig vanished to leave his masculine coiffure stark naked, there was a roar of laughter that must have shaken the Roxy's rococo ceiling".
According to TV Guide, "Jack Benny was never better (with the possible exception of his classic To Be or Not to Be) and carries the film with a top-flight performance. This was his first role of any consequence other than his previous tailor-made parts with radio jokes flying thick and fast around his well-known persona."

The film was promoted on The Jell-o Program, the name for Benny's radio show at the time. The plot of the 18 May 1941 episode sees the cast visit Jack "on-set". One gag sees Benny's contract require him to feed Darryl F. Zanuck's horse.

References

External links

1941 films
1940s historical comedy films
20th Century Fox films
American historical comedy films
American black-and-white films
Films scored by Alfred Newman
Films based on Charley's Aunt
Films directed by Archie Mayo
Films set in London
Films set in Oxford
Films set in the 1890s
Films produced by William Perlberg
1940s English-language films
1940s American films